The Dominican Republic men's national under-17 basketball team represents the Dominican Republic in basketball competition. It represents the country in international under-16 and under-17 (under age 16 and under age 17) basketball competitions.

World Cup record

References

Men's national under-17 basketball teams
B